Olav Stedje (Born 8 June 1953 in Sogndal, Norway) is a Norwegian singer-songwriter, known for a number of soft rock recordings, six silver albums and three attempts in Melodi Grand Prix.

Career 
Stedje debuted as a solo singer within the band Compact from Sogndal, in the early 1970s, releasing two singles. He had his Norwegian break through with the album Ta meg med in 1981, receiving an Spellemannpris in 1982.

Honors 
1982: Spellemannprisen in the class Pop

Discography 

Ta meg med (Take me with you) (1981)
Stedje (1982)
Tredje stedje (Third stedje) (1983)
Rocken Bom (1984)
Silje (1984)
Når sola renn (When the sun run) (1986)
Eg kjem likevel (I'll come anyway) (1987)
Ei gåve til deg (A gift to you) (1990)
Bot og bedring (Stay well) (Tylden Records, 1995)
21 beste (The best 21) (Tylden Records, 1998)
Livstegn (Lifesigns) (25 September 2006)

References

Norwegian male singers
Melodi Grand Prix contestants
1953 births
Living people
Musicians from Sogndal